Giuseppe Alessandro Barone (born September 4, 1998) is an American professional soccer player who plays as a midfielder for Charlotte Independence in the USL League One.

Career

Youth, college and amateur
Barone joined his local club side Brooklyn Italians in 2002, where he stayed until 2018, appearing for the club's first team in the NPSL before and during college. Prior to college, Barone attended Xaverian High School in Brooklyn, New York.

In 2016, Barone attended Long Island University to play college soccer. In three seasons with the Sharks, Barone made 53 appearances, scoring six goals and tallying 15 assists. Barone was named second-team All-Northeast Conference and NEC All-Rookie team in his freshman season.

Barone skipped his senior season playing at college to play with New York Cosmos B in the NPSL, whilst still studying at LIU. Here he made 13 regular season appearances, bagging three goals.

Professional

Perugia
On January 22, 2020, Barone moved to Italy to sign with Serie B club Perugia. Shortly after signing with Perugia, Barone suffered a knee injury.

Salernitana
He moved to fellow Serie B side Salernitana in October 2020, appearing on the bench for the team 15 times during the 2020–21 season, but Barone didn't make a first team appearance for the club.

Ascoli
In August 2021, Barone moved again within Serie B, joining Ascoli. He appeared on the bench a single time for the first team, before mutually agreeing to terminate his contract with the club in January 2022.

Charlotte Independence
On March 16, 2022, Barone returned to the United States, signing with USL League One club Charlotte Independence. He made his professional debut on April 8, 2022, appearing as an 89th–minute substitute during a 3–3 draw with Central Valley Fuego FC.

Personal
Giuseppe is the son of Joe Barone, general manager of ACF Fiorentina in Serie A, and former New York Cosmos vice president.

References 

1998 births
Living people
American expatriate soccer players
American expatriate sportspeople in Italy
American soccer players
American people of Italian descent
Ascoli Calcio 1898 F.C. players
Association football midfielders
Brooklyn Italians players
Charlotte Independence players
Expatriate footballers in Italy
LIU Sharks men's soccer players
National Premier Soccer League players
New York Cosmos (2010) players
A.C. Perugia Calcio players
U.S. Salernitana 1919 players
Sportspeople from Brooklyn
Soccer players from New York City
USL League One players
Xaverian High School alumni